20 Years Paranoid was a concert tour by American-Scottish alternative rock group Garbage, to mark the twentieth anniversary of their second album Version 2.0. The title also references the album's second single "I Think I'm Paranoid", and the promotional poster is redolent of the album's orange jacket artwork. The tour was preceded in June by a special 20th anniversary edition of Version 2.0, which was re-mastered in late 2017. Garbage will perform the album in its entirety as well as all the B-sides recorded and released during the album's promotional cycle spanning the years 1998–2000.

Tour announcement

The commemorative tour was initially announced in September 2017 with a single headline show confirmed in London. Further European dates, including a "homecoming" concerts in Glasgow and Edinburgh, and a show at Paris Bataclan, were announced the following February. Before the first shows were announced, Shirley Manson told Variety in mid 2017 that "We’re thinking of doing a Version 2.0 anniversary tour [to mark the album’s 20th anniversary] with all of the album tracks and B-sides, so there will be a lot of songs that we have not even played before that we’ll be trying next year." North American dates were announced in April, with Mexican shows following in July.

Upon the announcement of the tour, Shirley Manson stated: "Version 2.0 was a very significant record for us and we know our fans feel the same way about it too. This should be a very special night for us all". Manson later told Hot Press: "Revisiting the b-sides has been interesting because some of them were literally written in an afternoon and then forgotten about until now. One of them, 'Lick the Pavement' is this un-thought out, un-tampered with burst of energy. There's also a version of Big Star’s 'Thirteen', which Alex Chilton said was his favourite cover of any of his songs. It's not a pat on the head... it's a fucking medal with a garland of flowers beneath it. I mean, Big Star... it doesn't get any cooler than that!"

Garbage preempted the tour with a short set at the Electric Picnic festival in Republic of Ireland on Sunday 2 September. The band preceded Nile Rodgers & Chic, George Ezra, Picture This and The Prodigy. The tour was also supplemented by two festival shows in North America: CalJam in San Bernardino, CA preceding Tenacious D, Iggy Pop with Post Pop Depression and Foo Fighters, and ended their run at the Mother of All Rock Festival in Monterrey, Mexico, preceding Sammy Hagar, Whitesnake and Guns N' Roses.

Support Acts
Honeyblood (Edinburgh, Glasgow, Bristol, Birmingham)
The Horrors (Bristol)
Maxïmo Park (Birmingham)
Estrons (Manchester, Nottingham, Newcastle)
Dream Wife (London, European shows)
Rituals of Mine (United States shows)
Valerian (Mexican shows)

Setlists

An orchestral sample, pitch-shifted and slowed down preceded the band onstage, where they opened with b-sides "Afterglow" and "Deadwood". These, alongside "13x Forever", are live debuts on this tour. Album tracks intersperse b-sides throughout, peaking the main set with three of their biggest songs. Deep cuts such as "Wicked Ways", "Medication", "Sleep Together" and "Dumb" had not been performed by the band in almost twenty years. "Wicked Ways" is mashed-up with a section from Depeche Mode's "Personal Jesus", "13x Forever" ends on a part from The Kinks' "Tired of Waiting for You", while "You Look So Fine" features an extended outro of lyrics from Fleetwood Mac's "Dreams". Further into the run Shirley adlibbed from Siouxsie and the Banshees "Happy House" on "Sleep Together". Some of the songs are preceded with pop-cultural reference samples triggered to lead in the music. These include dialogue from movies such as Natural Born Killers, To Have and Have Not, Sex, Lies, and Videotape, 2001: A Space Odyssey, Blade Runner, All About Eve, The Conversation, The Graduate, Eternal Sunshine of a Spotless Mind and The Crow. The encore consists of album centrepiece "The Trick Is to Keep Breathing" and a cover version of David Bowie's "Starman", which was released on November 23, 2018 as b-side of the "Destroying Angels" single.

The band rehearsed around 25 songs for the tour. At both London shows, "Starman" was substituted for "No Horses" and "Cherry Lips", which continued on as the closing songs for the rest of the tour. Some fan requests were taken at points, including Beautiful Garbage tracks "Cup of Coffee" and "Parade". Late into the run, the band performed "#1 Crush" and "Only Happy When it Rains" in lieu of "No Horses".

Tour dates

Reviews

 The opening night in Edinburgh was slightly marred with some sound issues, which Chris Mackinnon, writing for the Edinburgh Evening News, commented "despite the odd hiccup, it was a fine outing". He also noted, "THIS could be the very definition of risk: A celebration of possibly your most lauded album, in your home-town. On the 1st night of a tour. But it totally paid off."

Promotional performances

References

External links
Garbage official website

2018 concert tours
Garbage (band) concert tours